Vallerand is a surname. Notable people with the surname include:

André Vallerand (born 1940), Canadian politician
Jean Vallerand (1915–1994), Canadian classical violinist, composer, conductor, music critic, educator and writer
Marc-Olivier Vallerand (born 1989), Canadian ice hockey player